William Campbell House may refer to:

William Campbell House (Stamping Ground, Kentucky), listed on the National Register of Historic Places (NRHP)
William S. Campbell House, Franklin, Tennessee, NRHP-listed
William H. and Alma Downer Campbell House, Wabasha, Minnesota, in Wabasha County, NRHP-listed
William Campbell House (Park City, Utah), NRHP-listed

See also
Campbell House (disambiguation)